The ISTAR Battalion (BISTAR, Batalhão ISTAR in Portuguese) is the Portuguese Army unit responsible for centralizing the intelligence, surveillance, target acquisition and reconnaissance (ISTAR) missions.

The ISTAR started to be raised in 2009, following NATO requisites and the need felt by the Portuguese Army to develop the capability to give ISTAR support to its operational brigades and to its deployed forces in foreign territory.

Organization
The BISTAR is organized as command element and aggregating unit, being made up with the grouping of sub-units specialized in the different ISTAR capabilities, which are raised by several other units. It includes:
 Headquarters and Headquarters Company;
 C2 Company;
 Electronic Warfare Company;
 HUMINT Platoon;
 Reconnaissance Platoon;
 Unattended Ground Sensor Section;
 Low Altitude Medium Endurance UAV Platoon;
 Weapon Locating Platoon;
 Weapon Locating Accousting Sensor Platoon;
 Forward Observers Platoon..

Units 

 3rd Cavalry Regiment – Reconnaissance Squadron;
 1st Reconnaissance Platoon (1PelRec); 
 2nd Reconnaissance Platoon (2PelRec); 
 Medium Mortar Platoon (PelMortMed); 
 Transmissions Section (SecTm);
 Battlefield Surveillance Section (SecVCB); 
 Maintenance Section (SecMan);
 Refueling Section (SecReab); 
 Sanitary Section (SecSan).

 Transmission Regiment – Electronic Warfare Company (CompGE);
 Support Platoon (PelAp);
 Electronic Warfare Platoon (Medium) (PelGE) (Med);
 Electronic Warfare Platoon (Light) (Pel GE) (Lig).

 Army Geospatial Information Center –  Army Geospatial Support Unit (UnApGeo).
 Geospatial Analysis Element (ElAnGelo);
 Data Acquisition Element (ElAqDados);
 Technical Control Element (ElContrTecn).
 5th Artillery Regiment– Surveillance Systems Company (CSV);

Equipment 

 Panhard M11;
 AeroVironment RQ-11 Raven;
 M114A1 155 mm howitzer;
 AN/TPQ-36 Firefinder radar;
 MARWIN MW12 weather station;
 Shelters with workstations for intelligence analysis and command post for information assessment.

References 

Army units and formations of Portugal
Targeting (warfare)
Military of Portugal